Chancel flowers (also known as altar flowers) are flowers that are placed in the chancel of a Christian church. These chancel flowers are often paid for by members of a congregation as an offering of thanksgiving to God. Chancel flowers are often placed upon or adjacent to the altar table, as well as near other church furniture in the chancel, such as the baptismal font, lectern and pulpit.

Chancel flowers are sometimes dedicated to the memory of someone who has died by the purchasing family. Certain species of flowers are used during the various liturgical seasons of the Christian Kalendar, such as poinsettias during Christmastide  (symbolic of the Star of Bethlehem) and Easter lilies during Eastertide (symbolic of the resurrection of Jesus).

Many historic Christian denominations, such as the Methodist Churches, only permit live flowers upon the chancel:

The Catholic Church likewise teaches that “the use of living flowers and plants, rather than artificial greens, serves as a reminder of the gift of life God has given to the human community.”

References

External links 
Guidelines for Chancel Flowers - Armed Forces Chaplains Board

Altars
Christian religious objects
Christian religious furniture